Valery Gore is a Canadian indie pop singer-songwriter and pianist.

A classically trained pianist who describes her own style as "jazz and classically influenced piano pop", Gore released her self-titled debut album on Six Shooter Records in 2005, and followed up with Avalanche to Wandering Bear on Do Right! Music in 2008. She has toured Canada, Italy and Japan, both as a headliner and as an opening act for Jorane, Josh Ritter and Joel Plaskett.

Discography
 Valery Gore (2005)
 Avalanche to Wandering Bear (2008)
 Saturated Spring (2013)
 Idols in the Dark Heart (2014)

References

External links
 Valery Gore at CBC Radio 3

Year of birth missing (living people)
Living people
Canadian pop pianists
Canadian women pianists
Canadian singer-songwriters
Musicians from Toronto
Canadian indie rock musicians
Six Shooter Records artists
Canadian indie pop musicians
Canadian women pop singers
21st-century Canadian pianists
21st-century Canadian women singers
21st-century women pianists